The Taipei Liaison Office in Cape Town represents the interests of Taiwan in South Africa in the absence of formal diplomatic relations, functioning as a de facto consulate. Its counterpart in Taiwan is the Liaison Office of the Republic of South Africa in Taipei. 

The Office is headed by a Representative, currently .  

The Office has responsibility for the provinces of Western Cape, Northern Cape and Eastern Cape, as well as Namibia.  

The Office was formerly the Consulate-General of the Republic of China. However, when South Africa recognised the People's Republic of China, its diplomatic relations with Taiwan were terminated. This led to the establishment of the Office in 1998.  

There is also a Taipei Liaison Office in the Republic of South Africa located in Pretoria, which has responsibility for the rest of South Africa, as well as Mauritius, Madagascar, Seychelles, Réunion, Comoros, Kenya, Uganda, Malawi, Tanzania, Zambia, Somalia, Rwanda, Burundi, Eritrea, Angola, Zimbabwe, Botswana, Lesotho.

See also
 List of diplomatic missions in South Africa
 South Africa–Taiwan relations

References

External links
 Taipei Liaison Office in the Republic of South Africa

 

Taiwan
1998 establishments in South Africa
Organizations established in 1998
South Africa
South Africa–Taiwan relations